William Kopp may refer to:
 William Kopp (Ohio politician), former member of the Ohio House of Representatives
 William F. Kopp (1869–1938), Republican U.S. Representative from Iowa